Coleophora delmastroella is a moth of the family Coleophoridae. It is found in Italy and France.

References

delmastroella
Moths described in 2000
Moths of Europe